The Australian Geospatial-Intelligence Organisation (AGO) is an Australian government intelligence agency that is part of the Department of Defence responsible for the collection, analysis, and distribution of geospatial intelligence (GEOINT) in support of Australia's defence and national interests. The AGO is one of six agencies that form the Australian Intelligence Community.

History
Defence Imagery and Geospatial Organisation (DIGO) was originally formed in 2000 when the Australian Imagery Organisation, the Defence Topographic Agency and the Directorate of Strategic Military Geographic Information were brought together to form the DIGO.

DIGO was renamed Australian Geospatial-Intelligence Organisation (AGO) on 3 May 2013. AGO is part of the Australian Department of Defence.

Operations
During 2014, the AGO assisted in the search for the remains of Malaysia Airlines Flight 370.

The operations of the agency are subject to independent statutory oversight by the Inspector-General of Intelligence and Security.

See also

References

Attribution

External links
AGO homepage
Open Australia Search: Parliamentary records mentioning 'geospatial'.

Australian intelligence agencies
Commonwealth Government agencies of Australia
Defence Strategic Policy and Intelligence Group
Geospatial intelligence organizations
1982 establishments in Australia
Government agencies established in 1982